Metrodorus of Lampsacus (5th century BC) was a Pre-Socratic philosopher from the Greek town of Lampsacus on the eastern shore of the Hellespont. He was a contemporary and friend of Anaxagoras. He wrote on Homer, the leading feature of his system of interpretation being that the deities and stories in Homer were to be understood as allegorical modes of representing physical powers and phenomena. He is mentioned in Plato's dialogue Ion. He died in 464 BC.

Notes

References
 Der Kleine Pauly. vol. 3, col. 1280.
 Fuentes González, Pedro Pablo, “Métrodore de Lampsaque”, in R. Goulet (ed.), Dictionnaire des Philosophes Antiques, vol. IV, Paris, CNRS, 2005, p. 508-514.
 

5th-century BC Greek people
5th-century BC philosophers
464 BC deaths
People from Lampsacus
Presocratic philosophers
Year of birth unknown